The Chinese Ambassador to New Zealand is the official representative of the People's Republic of China to New Zealand.
 
The ambassador is also accredited to the Cook Islands and Niue.

List of representatives

References

Ambassadors of China to New Zealand
New Zealand
China